CGS Bradbury (later CCGS Bradbury) is a retired fisheries patrol vessel for the federal Department of Transport's Marine Services (as predecessor of today's Canadian Coast Guard), constructed in 1915. The vessel was sold to commercial interests in 1935. The ship was removed from service in 1973 and became a museum ship on static display at the Marine Museum of Manitoba.

Description
Initially powered by coal-burning steam engines, the ship was converted to diesel engines in 1935.

Service history
Prefabricated in Sorel, Quebec, Bradbury was assembled on the bank of the Selkirk, Manitoba slough in 1915. Bradbury was operated as a federal fisheries patrol vessel on Lake Winnipeg until 1930, when the ship was transferred to the provincial Manitoba government. In 1917, Bradbury travelled through thick ice, taking doctors and medicine to a northern settlement struck by a flu epidemic.

Recommissioned in 1952 after having been idle since 1935, Bradbury remained in service until 1973. Bradbury is now on static display at the Marine Museum of Manitoba.

Notes

Citations

Sources
 

Service vessels of Canada
Ships built in Quebec
Museum ships in Canada
Museum ships in Manitoba
1915 ships
Icebreakers of the Canadian Coast Guard
Lighthouse tenders of Canada